Strickersville is an unincorporated community in extreme southeastern Chester County, Pennsylvania, United States. It is located at the intersection of Pennsylvania Route 896 and Strickersville Road in London Britain Township. While it once supported a number of small businesses in the late 19th century, today its location is marked only by the aforementioned crossroads and several historic homes. Lunn's Tavern, a large stone and brick building just north of the Strickersville Road intersection, is a listed in the National Register of Historic Places.

References 

Unincorporated communities in Chester County, Pennsylvania
Unincorporated communities in Pennsylvania